Valeria Aleshicheva (born 20 August 1990) is a Ukrainian football midfielder, currently playing for Ryazan.

Honours 
Ryazan
Winner
 Russian Women's Football Championship: 2013
 Russian Women's Cup: 2014

External links 
 

1990 births
Living people
Sportspeople from Donetsk
Ukrainian women's footballers
WFC Donchanka Donetsk players
WFC Mariupolchanka Mariupol players
Expatriate women's footballers in Russia
Ukrainian expatriate sportspeople in Russia
FC Energy Voronezh players
Ryazan-VDV players
Ukraine women's international footballers
Women's association football midfielders